James Donald Chesteen Jr. (born August 27, 1953) is a Republican member of the Alabama Senate, representing the 29th District since November 7, 2018. He previously served in the Alabama House of Representatives representing the 87th district from November 3, 2010, to November 7, 2018. Chesteen is a former high school football coach and educator, as was his father, James Donald "J.D. Chesteen", who is a member of the Alabama High School Athletic Association Sports Hall of Fame.

References

1953 births
Living people
Alabama Republicans
21st-century American politicians